Several political parties operate in Trentino-Alto Adige/Südtirol, and historically they have been even more than today. The Region is composed of two autonomous provinces, having two different system of parties: Trentino and South Tyrol.

No one party has ever had the chance of gaining power alone (even though Lega Nord Trentino and the South Tyrolean People's Party are by far the largest parties in their Province) and thus parties must work with each other to form  coalition governments.

Trentino

South Tyrol

See also
List of political parties in Italy

Politics of Trentino-Alto Adige/Südtirol
Trentino-Alto Adige Sudtirol

de:Parteien Südtirols